The District of Columbia Voting Rights Amendment was a proposed amendment to the United States Constitution that would have given the District of Columbia full representation in the United States Congress, full representation in the Electoral College system, and full participation in the process by which the Constitution is amended. It would have also repealed the Twenty-third Amendment, which granted the District of Columbia the same number of electoral votes as that of the least populous state, but gave it no role in contingent elections.

The amendment was proposed by the U.S. Congress on August 22, 1978, and the legislatures of the 50 states were given seven years to consider it. Ratification by 38 states was necessary for the amendment to become part of the Constitution; only 16 states had ratified it when the seven-year time limit expired on August 22, 1985. This proposed constitutional amendment is the most recent one to have been sent to the states for their consideration.

Text

Legislative history
Representative Don Edwards of California proposed House Joint Resolution 554 in the 95th Congress. The United States House of Representatives passed it on March 2, 1978, by a 289–127 vote, with 18 not voting. The United States Senate passed it on August 22, 1978, by a 67–32 vote, with 1 not voting. With that, the District of Columbia Voting Rights Amendment was submitted to the state legislatures for ratification. The Congress, via Section 4, included the requirement that ratification by three-fourths (38) of the states be completed within seven years following its passage by the Congress (i.e., August 22, 1985) in order for the proposed amendment to become part of the Constitution. By placing the ratification deadline in the text of the proposed amendment the deadline could not be extended without a separate amendment to the Constitution, in contrast to the ratification deadline of the Equal Rights Amendment which was restricted by statute and not the amendment itself.

Ratification history
Ratification by the legislatures of at least 38 of the 50 states by August 22, 1985, was necessary for the District of Columbia Voting Rights Amendment to become part of the Constitution. During the seven-year period specified by Congress it was ratified by only 16 states and so failed to be adopted. The amendment was ratified by the following states:

New Jersey on September 11, 1978
Michigan on December 13, 1978
Ohio on December 21, 1978
Minnesota on March 19, 1979
Massachusetts on March 19, 1979
Connecticut on April 11, 1979
Wisconsin on November 1, 1979
Maryland on March 19, 1980
Hawaii on April 17, 1980
Oregon on July 6, 1981
Maine on February 16, 1983
West Virginia on February 23, 1983
Rhode Island on May 13, 1983
Iowa on January 19, 1984
Louisiana on June 24, 1984
Delaware on June 28, 1984

Effects if it had been adopted

Had it been adopted, this proposed amendment would have given the District of Columbia most of the same rights as a state, but it would not have made the district into a state, nor affected Congress's authority over it. The District of Columbia would have been given full representation in both houses of Congress, so that it would have two senators and a variable number of representatives based on population.

The proposed amendment would also have repealed the Twenty-third Amendment. The Twenty-third Amendment does not allow the district to have more electoral votes "than the least populous State", nor does it grant the District of Columbia any role in contingent elections of the president by the House of Representatives (or of the vice president by the Senate). In contrast, this proposed amendment would have provided the district full participation in presidential (and vice presidential) elections.

Finally, the proposed amendment would have allowed the Council of the District of Columbia, the Congress, or the people of the district (depending on how the amendment would have been interpreted) to decide whether to ratify any proposed amendment to the Constitution, or to apply to the Congress for a convention to propose amendments to the United States Constitution, just as a state's legislature can under the Constitutional amendment process laid out in Article V of the Constitution.

See also

District of Columbia voting rights
List of amendments to the United States Constitution, amendments sent to the states, both ratified and unratified
List of proposed amendments to the United States Constitution, amendments proposed in Congress but never sent to the states for ratification

References

1978 in American law
1978 in American politics
Unratified amendments to the United States Constitution
Voting Rights Amendment
Voting Rights Amendment
1978 documents
95th United States Congress
Legal history of the District of Columbia